The First Secretary of the Central Committee of the Communist Party of Ukraine was a party leader of the republican branch of the Communist Party of the Soviet Union. The office' name alternated throughout its history between First Secretary and the General Secretary. 

While the CPU leader was not officially the leader of Ukraine, he was so de facto through the Article 6 of the Soviet Constitution, which indicated that the Communist Party of the Soviet Union was the "leading and guiding force of the Soviet society". On October 24, 1990, the provision on the monopoly of the Communist Party of Ukraine on power was excluded from Article 6 of the Constitution of the Ukrainian SSR and accordingly, the first secretary of the Central Committee ceased to be considered the actual head of the republic. 

The First Secretary was elected at a plenum (plenary session) of the Central Committee, while each Central Committee of the Communist Party of Ukraine was elected at the each Party's Congress. The longest serving secretary was Vladimir Shcherbitsky with some 17 years.

Name change
 1918–1920 Secretary of the Central Committee of the Communist Party of Ukraine
 1920–1921 First Secretary of the Central Committee of the Communist Party of Ukraine
 1921–1921 Responsible Secretary of the Central Committee of the Communist Party of Ukraine
 1921–1925 First Secretary of the Central Committee of the Communist Party of Ukraine
 1925–1934 General Secretary of the Central Committee of the Communist Party of Ukraine
 1934–1991 First Secretary of the Central Committee of the Communist Party of Ukraine

Historical scope
The post of Secretary was elected by a plenum (plenary session) of the Central Committee of the Communist Party of Ukraine beginning since July 1918. Until 1920 it was a single post of the Central Committee Secretariat. In 1920 Nikolay Bestchetvertnoi was dismissed as the secretary and the Provisional Bureau of the Central Committee elected Stanislav Kosior as the Party's Secretary. 

Later in 1920 there were introduced a post of the Second Secretary which acted as a deputy of the First Secretary. In 1921 after Vyacheslav Molotov was dismissed as the First Secretary, he was replaced with Feliks Kon as the Responsible Secretary. Kon became the only party official with such title which he held until end of 1921. Starting with 1921 beside the First and the Second secretaries, there were elected some additional secretaries, first of which became Stanislav Kosior.

In March of 1925 on a statement of the Central Committee of the Communist Party of Ukraine the post held by Emanuil Kviring had changed its name to the General Secretary. Less than a month later a plenum of the Central Committee of the Communist Party of Ukraine reelected the party's leader Lazar Kaganovich with the new title name. In January of 1934 Stanislav Kosior was elected as the First Secretary returning to previous name which has been kept until the dissolution of the Soviet Union.

In 1927–1930 the Communist Party of Ukraine also had posts of a candidate to Secretariat members. In 1931–1932 there were secretaries for specific types of industry as well as a separate secretary for "Donbas" (Ivan Akulov). In June of 1937 there was introduced a post of the Third Secretary which existed until January of 1949. In May of 1940 a practice of electing a secretary for specifically assigned industry was renewed and continued throughout the World War II until the next planum of the Central Committee of the Communist Party of Ukraine in January of 1949.

Until 1952 the Communist Party of Ukraine was officially known as the Communist Party (Bolsheviks) of Ukraine (CP(b)U).

List of first and second secretaries
Mykola Oleksiiovych Skrypnyk (20 April–26 May 1918) (Secretary of the Organizational Bureau)

Other members of Secretariat

Third Secretary
 Nikolay Popov (3 June 1937 – 3 July 1937)
 Demian Korotchenko (22 July 1939 – 9 July 1946)
 Konstantin Litvin (10 July 1946 – 28 January 1949)

Other Secretaries

 Stanislav Kosior (14 December 1921 – 17 October 1922)
 Dmitry Lebed (November 1920 – May 1924)
 Yakov Drobnis (17 October 1922 – 10 April 1923)
 Mikhail Vladimirsky (17 May 1924 – 12 December 1925)
 Boris Kholyavskiy (17 May 1924 – 5 April 1925)
 Aleksandr Shumsky (17 May 1924 – 12 December 1925)
 Fyodor Kornyushin (7 April 1925 – 24 November 1926)
 Vladimir Zatonsky (12 December 1925 – 24 February 1927)
 Kuprian Kirkizh (12 December 1925 – 24 November 1926)
 Ivan Klimenko (12 December 1925 – 13 October 1927)
 Pavel Postyshev (24 November 1926 – 22 July 1930)
 Aleksei Medvedev (28 October 1927 – 18 November 1929)
 Afanasiy Lyubchenko (29 November 1927 – 13 June 1934)
 Lavrentiy Kartvelishvili (21 November 1929 – 15 June 1930)
 Roman Terekhov (22 July 1930 – 5 January 1933)
 Vladimir Chernyavskiy (13 December 1930 – 28 January 1932; in transport)
 Nikita Alekseyev (30 November 1931 – 28 January 1932; in supply)
 Fyodor Zaitsev (28 January 1932 – 8 June 1933; in transport)
 Naum Golod (July 1932 – 8 June 1933; in supply)
 Ivan Akulov (12 October 1932 – 18 November 1933; in Donbass)
 Mendel Khatayevich (29 January 1933 – 23 January 1934)
 Nikolay Popov (27 February 1933 – 3 June 1937)
 Moisei Spivak (17 May 1940 – 21 January 1944; in human resources)
 Iosif Lysenko (17 May 1940 – 1941; in propaganda and political agitation (went missing))
 Aleksei Stoyantsev (7 May 1941 – 1943; in aviation industry)
 Ivan Vivdychenko (7 May 1941 – 1943; in engineering)
 Ivan Gorobets (7 May 1941 – 1943; in metallurgy industry)
 Aleksei Kirichenko (7 May 1941 – 21 January 1944; in industry)
 Pyotr Zakharov (7 May 1941 – 1943; in construction and construction materials)
 A. Nikolayenko (7 May 1941 – 1943; in transport)
 Pyotr Matsuy (7 May 1941 – 1943; in power stations and power industry)
 Aleksei Kirichenko (21 January 1944 – July 1945; in human resources)
 Konstantin Litvin (6 October 1944 – 9 July 1946; in propaganda and political agitation)
 Aleksei Yepishev (10 July 1946 – 28 January 1949; in human resources)
 Ivan Nazarenko (10 July 1946 – 25 May 1948; in propaganda and political agitation)
 Demian Korotchenko (3 March 1947 – 26 December 1947; in industry)
 Nikolay Patolichev (3 March 1947 – 21 July 1947; in agriculture and procurement)
 Leonid Melnikov (21 July 1947 – 26 December 1947)
 Konstantin Litvin (28 January 1949 – 13 April 1950)
 Ivan Nazarenko (28 January 1949 – 25 June 1956)
 Zinoviy Serdyuk (28 January 1949 – May 1952)
 Grigoriy Grishko (28 February 1951 – 27 September 1952)
 Nikita Bubnovskiy (May 1952 – 27 September 1952)
 Nikita Bubnovskiy (26 March 1954 – 26 March 1963)
 Olga Ivaschenko (25 May 1954 – 8 January 1965)
 Stepan Chervonenko (26 June 1956 – 22 October 1959)
 Leontiy Naidek (4 December 1957 – 26 December 1957)
 Vladimir Scherbitskiy (4 December 1957 – 17 May 1961)
 Andrei Skaba (24 October 1959 – 29 March 1968)
 Anton Gayevoy (19 May 1961 – 3 July 1962; died in office)
 Pyotr Shelest (11 August 1962 – 1 July 1963)
 Ivan Grushetskiy (25 December 1962 – 18 March 1966)
 Vasiliy Komyakhov (25 December 1962 – 16 October 1966; died in office)
 Aleksandr Lyashko (1 July 1963 – 18 March 1966)
 Vasiliy Drozdenko (18 March 1966 – 20 March 1971)
 Aleksei Titarenko (18 March 1966 – 22 October 1982)
 Ivan Lutak (23 January 1967 – 19 June 1969)
 Fyodor Ovcharenko (29 March 1968 – 10 October 1972)
 Nikolay Borisenko (31 March 1970 – 8 May 1980; died in office)
 Yakov Pogrebnyak (20 March 1971 – 24 March 1987)
 Valentin Malanchuk (10 October 1972 – 26 April 1979)
 Aleksandr Kapto (26 April 1979 – 8 February 1986)
 Ivan Mozgovoy (28 May 1980 – 10 October 1988)
 Boris Kachura (22 October 1982 – 23 June 1990)
 Vasiliy Kryuchkov (21 September 1984 – 12 December 1988)
 Vladimir Ivashko (8 February 1986 – 25 April 1987)
 Stanislav Gurenko (25 March 1987 – 18 October 1989)
 Yuriy Yelchenko (25 April 1987 – 23 June 1990)
 Ivan Grintsov (11 October 1988 – until the party's liquidation)
 Leonid Kravchuk (18 October 1989 – 28 September 1990)
 Valentin Ostrozhinskiy (23 June 1990 – until the party's liquidation)
 Anatoliy Savchenko (23 June 1990 – until the party's liquidation)
 Vasiliy Lisovenko (15 April 1991 – until the party's liquidation)

Candidates to the Secretariat
 Nikolay Donenko (9 April 1929 – 18 November 1929)
 Olga Pilatskaya (9 April 1929 – 15 June 1930)
 Andrei Khvylia (9 April 1929 – 15 June 1930)
 Vladimir Chernyavskiy (21 November 1929 – 15 June 1930)

References

External links
 Secretariat of Central Committee of the CP(b)U (Handbook on history of the Communist Party and the Soviet Union 1898-1991)
 Vakhtang Kipiani, Volodymyr Fedoryn. "Shcherbytskyi said what kind of a stupid person invented the word perestroika? … ("Щербицкий сказал - какой дурак придумал слово перестройка?.."). Ukrayinska Pravda (Istorychna Pravda). 10 September 2011.

Ukrainian bolsheviks leaders
Bolshevik leaders
 
Central Committee of the Communist Party of Ukraine (Soviet Union)

 
1918 establishments in Russia
1991 disestablishments in the Soviet Union